Tudor Fieldhouse is multi-purpose arena in Houston, Texas.  Previously known as Rice Gymnasium, it was renamed in honor of Rice University alum Bobby Tudor, who spearheaded the renovation of the facility with a multimillion-dollar donation. The court is designated "Autry Court" in memory of Mrs. James L. Autry. Her husband James Lockhart Autry was a descendant of Micajah Autry, who was a hero of the Battle of the Alamo. Her daughter, Mrs. Edward W. Kelley, made a generous donation to the gymnasium building fund in honor of her late mother, an ardent supporter of Rice. The arena opened in 1950. It is home to the Rice Owls men's and women's basketball, and volleyball teams.

History

The facility was constructed in 1950 for the Rice basketball, volleyball and swim teams. An air conditioning system was added in 1991. Other renovations include a new ceiling, new lighting, and a new scoreboard. The facility currently seats 5,000 people.

Autry Court is also home of the notorious Autry Army, a group of students who attend every basketball game and heckle opponents.  They have recently been referred to as the "Blue Army of Death" by former University of Memphis men's head basketball coach John Calipari. The blue curtain on one side of the court is called a "distraction" by many colleges. At the end of the game, young fans are invited onto the court to shoot a free throw. If they make it, they win a basketball.

On February 7, 2007, a $23 million renovation of Autry Court was announced by Rice University.  The renovations are to be completed in time for the 2008-09 basketball season.  In the interim, Rice played its home games at Merrell Center in Katy (5 games), Reliant Arena (8 games) and Toyota Center (1 game) in Houston.

On July 29, 2008, Rice unveiled the new name of the arena, Tudor Fieldhouse, within a press release outlining non-conference opponents for the upcoming basketball season.

See also
 List of NCAA Division I basketball arenas

References

External links
 Facility details

College basketball venues in the United States
College volleyball venues in the United States
Basketball venues in Houston
Indoor arenas in Texas
Volleyball venues in Houston
Rice Owls basketball
College swimming venues in the United States
Swimming venues in Texas
Sports venues completed in 1950
1950 establishments in Texas